Arka Sokaklar (English: Back Streets) is a television crime series that was broadcast on Kanal D between 31 July 2006 and 18 November 2022. In its 17 consecutive seasons the series has become a success story with its TV ratings despite being criticized for continuity/logic errors, near superhero abilities of main characters, overused lines of dialogue, and excessive use of zoom.

Characters

Changed Characters

International broadcasters

See also
Television in Turkey
List of Turkish television series
Turkish television drama

References

External links

Turkish drama television series
2006 Turkish television series debuts
2010s Turkish television series
2000s Turkish television series
Kanal D original programming